Euchromia cincta is a moth of the subfamily Arctiinae. It was described by Xavier Montrouzier in 1864. It is found in New Caledonia east of Australia.

References

Moths described in 1864
Euchromiina